The Muskegon Area Transit System is the primary provider of mass transportation in Muskegon County, Michigan. Service is provided from Monday through Friday along seven routes. The agency also provides a Complementary ADA Paratransit Service that operates within 3/4 mile of the fixed routes. A micro-transit service called Go2 provides on-demand service Monday-Saturday. Go2 is sponsored by MATS and provided by Via.

Route list 

A: Route 1
B: Route 2
C: Route 11
D: Route 12
E: Route 21
F: Route 22
G: Route 31

References

External links 
 MATS

Bus transportation in Michigan